Cambashi is an Anglo-American industry analyst firm, focused on the market for Information Technology in the manufacturing, distribution, energy, utilities and construction industries. The company serves both suppliers and users of Information technology. It provides advisory services to most of the top ten suppliers in its field, especially in the fields of Product Lifecycle Management and Industrial Automation applications such as Manufacturing Operations Management.

Cambashi is known for its market data, which quantifies and maps out the global market for Information Technology in a range of vertical industries and their sub-sectors. In addition, it provides qualitative analysis, such as white papers and research studies, for long-time clients Infor, SAP, and Siemens.  In addition to its market data, the company also provides consulting services and an online industry training curriculum aimed at professionals working in vertical industries.

Cambashi's international market forecasts are widely quoted in the trade press.

History 

The company was founded in 1984 by Mike Evans. It focused on advisory services for users adopting CAD/CAM and related Computer-aided technologies and their suppliers.  In 1988, it co-founded CATN, the Computer Aided Technologies Network, a European Consortium providing advisory services on these technologies.

In 1990, Cambashi began to supply quantitative information on technical applications markets to support clients' market planning. For this, Cambashi published the first annual Marketing Managers Handbook. In 1991, when the IMS project for international cooperation on research and development activities in the domain of intelligent manufacturing systems was being established, Cambashi assisted European Community officials.  In 1993, CATN conducted a large-scale CIME Vertical Markets study for the European Commission investigating user demand for software.

In 1995, in Cambridge UK, Cambashi organized the first annual networking seminar on sales and marketing issues affecting the Information Technology Industry.  In 1997, Cambashi developed a comparative analysis of Enterprise resource planning solutions and authored the first edition of Ovum Evaluates "ERP for Manufacturers".

Cambashi is active in trade and industry associations. In 1996, in association with the Computing Suppliers Association, it published a study on the Document Management market.  Cambashi has partnered with the Manufacturing Enterprise Solutions Association (MESA) International on several research studies in the manufacturing industry. In 2006, the first MESA Metrics that Matter report was conducted by Industry Directions on behalf of MESA International.

Since 1998, Cambashi has developed a training curriculum that covers the business use of ICT in vertical industry sectors for suppliers customer facing staff.  In 2005, the first release of e-learning courseware was published on line.

In 2003, Cambashi published the first Market Observatory providing global quantitative research on the Technical Applications software markets.  In 2007, Cambashi delivered an invited submission to the UK Governments Science and Innovation Policy "Sainsbury Review."

In 2008, Boston, MA USA based Industry Directions, a research firm specializing in shop floor and supply chain solutions, merged its operations with Cambashi to form Cambashi Inc.

2010 heralded the first publication of the Cambashi Systems Engineering and Embedded Software Product Observatory, with research findings originally published in COFES Israel. Cambashi's research observations on the technical applications market in Israel were also published in IDGConnect.

In 2012, Reuters  covered Cambashi's report on quality and innovation in medical device manufacturing and in 2013, the company presented at COFES Russia, with Managing Director Peter Thorne discussing the impact of ALM and PLM on Russian engineering.

Cambashi research recognition by the press 

Cambashi is frequently quoted in major publications and the international trade press:

The Financial Times quotes Mike Evans, Research Director in Reshoring: A change of location brings risks of its own
The Financial Times quotes Allan Behrens, Director on Sustainable Design Implementation:  The Long and the short of measuring carbon footprint
BBC News 24 interviews Mike Evans, Research Director, Cambashi on Microsoft's innovation record
Design Engineer quotes Aslihan Yener, Cambashi Consultant in Technical software recovery predicted in Cambashi report
FDAnews quotes Julie Fraser, President, Cambashi Inc. about challenges for CAPA systems
L'Usine Nouvelle quotes Mike Evans, Cambashi's Research Director, in an article "Autodesk dans la roue de Dassault Systemes" of 26 June 2008
Managing Automation quotes Julie Fraser, President, Cambashi Inc., on Manufacturing Execution Systems
Manufacturing Business Technology quotes Julie Fraser, President, Cambashi Inc., on New Approaches to Supply Chain Challenges
Mediaquell covers Cambashi's participation in the Hannover Fair, Germany
Vektorrum (formerly Engineering Automation Report) quotes Bob Brown, Principal Consultant, Cambashi about embedded software

Competitors 

Forrester Research
Gartner
International Data Corporation

References 

Companies based in Boston
Market research companies
Product lifecycle management
ERP software
Companies based in Cambridge